Thornton Quarry is one of the largest aggregate quarries in the world, located in Thornton, Illinois just south of Chicago. Gallagher Asphalt Corporation has been operating on the grounds of the quarry since 1928. A dryland dike carries Interstate 80/Interstate 294/Tri-State Tollway over the quarry.

As part of the Chicago Deep Tunnel project, both Thornton Quarry and McCook Quarry will serve as reservoirs to reduce the backflow of stormwater and sewage from Chicago area rivers into Lake Michigan.  Thornton Transitional Reservoir contributes a  capacity to the system, and is expected to contribute  when the system is completed in 2014.

It is estimated that the reservoir will help protect 500,000 people who live in the surrounding 14 suburbs it serves, and will save the city around $40 million worth of damages each year.

The quarry contains Silurian reefs which formed when the Michigan Basin was covered in sea water more than 400 million years ago.

History
The first settlers came to Thornton, Illinois, in 1834. Gurdon Saltonstall Hubbard received 160 acres of land from Watseka, his Potawatomi wife. In 1836 Hubbard opened the first quarry on Kinzie Street. The site was abandoned because the stone was too deep and of poor quality. Fred Gardner opened a quarry in 1846, and Stephen Crary opened one in 1850. In the early 1900s, Brownell Improvement Company purchased the entire area. Colonel Hodgkins bought the property in 1920. The quarry north of Ridge Road was opened in 1924, and a tunnel connecting the north and south quarries was developed in 1926. Colonel Hodgkins died in 1929, and Brownell repurchased the quarry in 1933. Then in 1938, Material Service Corporation purchased the property and has owned it ever since.

Contract with MWRD

The Metropolitan Water Reclamation District of Greater Chicago (MWRD) contracted to use the quarry for stormwater overflow in 1998 as part of the Deep Tunnel or Tunnel and Reclamation Project (TARP) for the metropolitan area. The Thornton Quarry supplies 7.9 billion gal US of stormwater storage, allowing the water to be treated before release into the waterways.

References

External links 

Thornton Quarry history 
Army Corps of Engineers - Chicagoland Underflow Project (CUP) Thornton Reservoir

Quarries in the United States
Geology of Illinois
Interstate 80
Interstate 294
Buildings and structures in Cook County, Illinois
Geography of Cook County, Illinois